Domestic trade, different from international trade, is the exchange of domestic goods within the boundaries of a country. This may be subdivided into two categories, wholesale and retail. Wholesale trade is concerned with buying goods from manufacturers or dealers or producers in large quantities and selling them in smaller quantities to others who may be retailers or even consumers. Wholesale trade is undertaken by wholesale merchants or wholesale commission agents.

Retail trade is concerned with the sale of goods in small quantities to consumers. This type of trade is taken care of by retailers. In actual practice, however, manufacturers and wholesalers may also undertake retail distribution of goods to bypass the intermediary retailer, by which they earn higher profits.

Importance and Role

The importance of domestic trade in a country is that it facilitates the exchange of goods within the country. By doing this it also makes sure that factors of production reach the right places so that the economy of the country can grow. Allowing all different types of goods and services to reach all parts of the country improves the standard of living of the residents of the country as well as the employment rate of the country. And it helps the growth of the industry by ensuring the availability of raw materials.

Traders from outside the country will have to come in contact with internal traders because it is not easy to come directly into another country and get the required products. Compared to international trade, domestic trades are less costly and risky.

Wholesale trade
Wholesalers play a major role in the working of domestic trade. One could even say that it is the backbone of the domestic market. A wholesaler is directly in contact with the manufacturers but in indirect contact with the consumers. A wholesaler generally deals with one type of industry. e.g. machinery, textile, stationery. A wholesaler is not only into selling products as it is also involved in Packaging, advertising, grading, and market research. They have their own go downs which save the manufacturers from bothering about storage. They normally make cash payments from retailers and sometimes consumers themselves and give advance payments which benefits the manufacturers. They sell in smaller quantities to retailers, which refrains the retailers from requiring storage space. They do allow credit facilities to retailers at times. For example, we see that Bhija one of the great wholesalers usually gets information documents from retailers.

Retail trade

A retailer is normally the final seller of a product. It makes its purchases made from Wholesalers and sales are made to the customers directly. Retailers do not particularly have to be from one industry i.e.v they can trade in a variety of products at the same time. It generally has purchases made by credit and sales made in cash. Sales as compared to wholesalers are made in small quantities. retailers carry out their trade at places where consumers live

References

Trade
Trade